Worle Town railway station served the village of Worle, North Somerset, England, from 1897 to 1940 on the Weston, Clevedon and Portishead Railway.

History 
The station was opened as Worle on 1 December 1897 by the Weston, Clevedon and Portishead Railway. It was one of the few stations to have basic facilities, a ticket office and a waiting room. It also has a siding which served Worle Gas Works until it closed in 1920, a platform which was later removed and an ungated crossing. The station's name was changed to Worle Moor in 1913 and changed to Worle Town on 1 November 1917. It closed on 20 May 1940.

Accidents 
Due to the crossing having no gates, several accidents occurred here. 

 On 31 August 1903, a train crashed into a wagonette, killing two people and injuring four other people. The cause was driver error.
 A lorry crashed into a carriage in October 1937. One passenger was fatally injured.
 On 7 September 1938, a train ran into a motorcycle. Both men, the one driving the motorcycle and the one in the pillion seat, were killed. This occurred because the motorcyclist had his head turned away from the direction of the oncoming train.

References

External links 

Disused railway stations in Somerset
Railway stations in Great Britain opened in 1897
Railway stations in Great Britain closed in 1940
1897 establishments in England
1940 disestablishments in England